Clarence Lloyd Gosse  (October 20, 1912 – December 21, 1996) was a Canadian physician and the 25th Lieutenant Governor of Nova Scotia.

Born in Spaniard's Bay, Newfoundland, he moved to Nova Scotia when he was ten. He graduated from the medical school of Dalhousie University in 1939. During World War II, serving in the Canadian Army Medical Corps, he was a member of one of the first surgical teams in the Battle of Normandy.

After the War, in Halifax, he was a Professor of Urology at Dalhousie University and Chair of the Department of Urology at the Victoria General and Camp Hill hospitals (now the Queen Elizabeth II Health Sciences Centre).

He was Lieutenant Governor of Nova Scotia from 1973 to 1978.

Awards and recognition

In 1982, he was made an Officer of the Order of Canada.

References
 A Guide to the Dr. Clarence Lloyd Gosse Collection
 Dr. Clarence Lloyd Gosse fonds

External links
Portrait photograph of Mr. and Mrs. Gosse

1912 births
1996 deaths
Canadian medical researchers
Dalhousie University alumni
Academic staff of the Dalhousie University
Lieutenant Governors of Nova Scotia
Officers of the Order of Canada
People from Newfoundland (island)
Canadian Army personnel of World War II
Canadian military personnel from Newfoundland and Labrador
Royal Canadian Army Medical Corps officers